Bhagabanpur Assembly constituency is an assembly constituency in Purba Medinipur district in the Indian state of West Bengal.

Overview
As per orders of the Delimitation Commission, No. 214 Bhagabanpur Assembly constituency is composed of the following: Bhagabanpur, Kajlagarh, Kotbarh and Shimulia gram panchayats of Bhagabanpur I community development block, Arjunnagar, Basudevberia, Baroj, Itaberia, Jukhia, Mugberia and Radhapur gram panchayats of Bhagabanpur II community development block, and Argoyal and Mathura gram panchayats of Patashpur II community development block.

Bhagabanpur Assembly constituency is part of No. 31 Kanthi (Lok Sabha constituency).

Members of Legislative Assembly

Election results

2021
In the 2021 election, Rabindranath Maity of BJP defeated his nearest rival, Ardhendu Maity of Trinamool Congress.

2016
In the 2016 election, Ardhendu Maity of Trinamool Congress defeated his nearest rival, Hemangshu Shekhar Mahapatra of Indian National Congress.

2011
In the 2011 election, Ardhendu Maity of Trinamool Congress defeated his nearest rival Ranajit Manna of SP.

  

.# Swing calculated on Congress+Trinamool Congress vote percentages taken together in 2006.

1977-2006
In the 2006 and 2001 state assembly elections, Ardhendu Maity of Trinamool Congress won the Bhagabanpur assembly seat defeating his nearest rivals Gour Kanti Bal and Prasanta Pradhan, both of CPI(M), in respective years. Contests in most years were multi cornered but only winners and runners are being mentioned. Ajit Khanra of Congress defeated Prasanta Pradhan of CPI(M) in 1996. Prasanta Pradhan of CPI(M) defeated Asoktaru Panda of Congress in 1991, Haripada Jana of Congress in 1987 and Ramkrishna Sarkar of Congress in 1982. Haripada Jana of Janata Party defeated Prasanta Pradhan of CPI(M) in 1977.

1957-1972
Amales Jana of Congress won in 1972. Prasanta Kumar Pradhan of CPI(M) won in 1971. Abha Maiti of Congress won in 1969, 1967 and 1962. In 1957 Bhagabanpur had a dual seat. It was won by Basanta Kumar Panda of PSP and Bhikhari Mondal of Congress.

References

Assembly constituencies of West Bengal
Politics of Purba Medinipur district